Stiphrosoma sabulosum is a species of fly in the family Anthomyzidae. It is found in the  Palearctic .

References

External links
 Images representing Stiphrosoma sabulosum at BOLD

Anthomyzidae
Insects described in 1837
Muscomorph flies of Europe